Discovery Home & Health Southeast Asia was a television channel based in Asia.
Discovery Home & Health Southeast Asia was available in Hong Kong, the Philippines, Indonesia, Singapore, Thailand, and Malaysia. The channel was launched on 1 January 2006.

On 1 August 2014, Discovery Home & Health was replaced by Eve, while Discovery Home & Health shows were moved to TLC on 7 July 2014, coinciding the change of Discovery Turbo to DMAX.

Programming
18 Kids and Counting
19 Kids and Counting
A Baby Story
A Makeover Story
Aerobic Conditioning
Big Medicine
Body Invaders
Bringing Home Baby
Bulging Brides
Call 911
Deliver Me
Deliver Me: Home Edition
Fixing Dinner
Human Stories
Here Comes Honey Boo Boo
I Didn't Know I Was Pregnant
Jon & Kate Plus 8
Last Chance Salon
Little People, Big World
Long Island Medium
Last Chance Salon
Make Room For Multiples
Perfect Housewife
Runway Moms
Say Yes To The Dress
Secretly Pregnant
Shalom in the Home
Strictly Dr. Drew
Surviving Sextuplets and Twins
The Fat Family
Til Debt Do Us Part
Total Body Sculpt With Gilad
Wedding Day Makeover
When Sleep Goes Bad
Yummy Mummy

See also 
 Discovery Home & Health (UK & Ireland)
 Discovery Home & Health

External links
Discovery Home & Health Asia

Warner Bros. Discovery networks
Warner Bros. Discovery Asia-Pacific
Television channels and stations established in 2004

ms:Discovery Real Time